The Bulgaria women's national tennis team represents Bulgaria in Billie Jean King Cup tennis competition and are governed by the Bulgarian Tennis Federation.

In 2022, Bulgaria competed in the Europe/Africa Zone Group I event in Antalya, where they finished in fourth place in Pool B of the competition. The team ended the group stage with a 2-3 W/L ratio after defeating Sweden and Georgia and successfully maintained their place in the Europe/Africa Zone Group I until 2023.

History
Bulgaria competed in its first Fed Cup in 1966. Until the 1996 edition of the competition the team has always played in the Fed Cup World Group. From 1996 the team is competing in Group I of the Europe/Africa Zone.

The best results of the Bulgarian Fed Cup team are the semifinals the team played in 1985 and 1987. The team also reached the quarterfinals of the competition in 1968, 1984, 1986, 1989, 1992 and 1994. These results are closely connected with the success of the Maleeva sisters (Magdalena Maleeva, Katerina Maleeva and Manuela Maleeva) who have represented Bulgaria for more than 20 years in the competition.

Current team 

Player information and rankings 

The following players were called up for the 2022 Billie Jean King Cup Europe/Africa Zone Group I in April 2022.

Recent callups

Recent performances
Here is the list of all match-ups since 1995, when the competition started being held in the current World Group format.

1990s

2000s

2010s

2020s

Team representatives 
This is a list of tennis players who have represented the Bulgaria Fed Cup team in an official Fed Cup match. A few of them have also been part of the Fed Cup teams of other countries.

See also
Fed Cup
Bulgaria Davis Cup team

External links

References

Billie Jean King Cup teams
Fed Cup
Fed Cup